The Lingiades massacre, on 3 October 1943, was a Nazi German war crime committed by members of the 1st Mountain Division of the Wehrmacht Heer during the Axis occupation of Greece. The village of Lingiades, near Ioannina in northwestern Greece, was arbitrarily chosen as a target for reprisals by the Wehrmacht due to the killing of a German officer by members of the Greek Resistance. The vast majority of the victims were children, women, and elderly.

Background
Greek resistance groups were active in northwestern Greece (Epirus) during World War II. On 1 October 1943, a unit of the National Republican Greek League (EDES) ambushed a German convoy near Preveza. In the firefight, the commander of Mountaineering Regiment 98, Lieutenant-Colonel Josef Salminger, was killed by Greek partisans. Salminger, an ardent Nazi, was notorious for conducting attacks against civilians, such as the massacre of Kommeno which resulted in the murder of 317 villagers.

Salminger's death prompted General Hubert Lanz, commander of the 1st Mountain Division, to order reprisals within a 20 km radius of the ambush. Lingiades, a tiny mountain village 13 kilometres northwest of Ioannina, overlooks Ioannina Lake and Ioannina from an elevation about 940 m above. The village could not be linked to resistance activity by German intelligence. It may have been chosen as a target due to its visibility from Ioannina. Its nearby destruction would likely spread terror among the local populace.

The attack
On Sunday, 3 October, elements of the German 79th Field Battalion commanded by Major Hans Mayr arrived in Lingiades. Of the town's 287 inhabitants, most village adults were in an neighbouring town for the walnut harvest. Villagers who could not run away were dragged by German soldiers to the central square of the village. After dwellings were searched and looted, all civilians were divided into small groups and driven into the cellars of various dwellings. There they were shot down by machine guns. Apart from the church and the village school, all buildings in the village were set on fire. The majority of the 92 victims were children, infants, women, and the aged. Thirty-two of the dead were aged between six months and 11 years. Five civilians managed to survive, two adults and three children. They feigned death among the corpses and then escaped from the burning buildings by ascending via the fireplace.

Investigation
No one was ever held accountable for the atrocity in Lingiades.

Memory
On 7 March 2014, German President Joachim Gauck visited Lingiades together with his Greek counterpart, Karolos Papoulias. Gauck was the first German official to visit the site. He expressed his apologies for the atrocities committed by the Wehrmacht, saying, "With shame and pain I ask in the name of Germany the families of the victims for forgiveness ... I bow in front of the victims for this monstrous crime."

References

Sources

1943 in Greece
Massacres in 1943
Epirus in World War II
Massacres in Greece during World War II
Mass murder in 1943
Nazi war crimes in Greece
October 1943 events
War crimes of the Wehrmacht